The East Bengal Express was one of three trains operated between India and East Pakistan. The rail link was suspended at the outbreak of the Indo-Pakistani War of 1965.

Overview
Prior to 1965, when armed conflict broke out between India and Pakistan, rail links existed between India and East Pakistan. Three trains ran between the two countries carrying goods and passengers: (1) East Bengal Express between Sealdah and Goalundo Ghat via Gede–Darshana (2) East Bengal Mail between Sealdah and  via Gede–Darshana, and (3) Barisal Express between Sealdah and Khulna via Petrapole–Benapole.

History
Eastern Bengal Railway opened the line from Calcutta to Goalundo, on the southern bank of the Padma  in 1871.

Goalundo
Here is a brief on the importance of Goalundo Ghat in earlier years:  "If one goes from Calcutta to Dacca the rail journey is broken at Goalundo and from there to Narayanganj is continued by steamer. The night mail from Calcutta deposits one at Goalundo in the early hours of the morning...  It (Goalundo) is situated at the junction of the Padma, or Ganges, and the Brahmaputra, and daily services of steamers connect it with the railway systems at Narayanganj and Chandpur, and with the steamer services to Madaripur, Barisal, Sylhet, and Cachar. There are also daily services of steamers up the Padma to Digha Ghat in the dry season, and Buxar in the rains, and up the Brahmaputra to Dibrugarh. From that it will be seen that Goalundo occupies a very strong strategic position in the waterways of Bengal, a position which has been made much stronger by railway development."

References

Named passenger trains of India
Named passenger trains of Bangladesh
International named passenger trains
Defunct trains in India
Railway services discontinued in 1965
1871 establishments in India
Transport in Kolkata